Hyriodes is a monotypic moth genus of the family Noctuidae. Its only species, Hyriodes leucocraspis, is found in Borneo. Both the genus and species were first described by George Hampson in 1910.

References

Acontiinae
Monotypic moth genera